Octanols are alcohols with the formula C8H17OH.  A simple and important member is 1-octanol, with an unbranched chain of carbons.  Other commercially important octanols are 2-octanol and 2-ethylhexanol.

There are 89 possible isomers of octanol. Some octanols occur naturally in the form of esters in some essential oils.

References

Fatty alcohols
Alkanols